Tishtrya or Roozahang is the Avestan language name of a Zoroastrian benevolent divinity associated with life-bringing rainfall and fertility. Tishtrya is Tir in Middle- and Modern Persian. As has been judged from the archaic context in which Tishtrya appears in the texts of the Avesta, the divinity/concept is almost certainly of Indo-Iranian origin.

In a hymn of the Avesta (incorporated by Ferdowsi, with due acknowledgement, in the Shahnameh), Tishtrya is involved in a cosmic struggle against the drought-bringing demon Apaosha. According to the myth, in the form of a pure white horse the god did battle with the demon who, in contrast, had assumed the form of a terrifying black horse. Apaosa soon gained the upper hand over Tishtrya, who was weakened from the lack of sufficient prayers and sacrifices from humankind. The yazata proceeded to call upon the Creator Ahura Mazda, who himself then intervened by offering a sacrifice to the overwhelmed god. Infused with the power brought by this sacrifice, Tishtrya was able to overcome Apaosa, and his rains were able to flow to the parched fields and pastures unabated by drought. This story serves to underscore the importance of votive offerings and sacrifice in religious tradition.

In the Zoroastrian religious calendar, the 13th day of the month and the 4th month of the year are dedicated to Tishtrya/Tir, and hence named after the entity. In the Iranian civil calendar, which inherits its month names from the Zoroastrian calendar, the 4th month is likewise named Tir.

During the Achaemenid period, Tishtrya was conflated with Semitic Nabu-*Tiri, and thus came to be associated with the Dog Star, Sirius. The Tiregan festival, previously associated with *Tiri (a reconstructed name), was likewise transferred to Tishtrya. During the Hellenic period, Tishtrya came to be associated with Pythian Apollo, patron of Delphi, and thus a divinity of oracles.

See also
 Tir (god)

References

   
  
 Hinnells, John R. (1997). Library of the World's Myths and Legends: Persian Mythology

Fertility gods
Sky and weather gods
Shahnameh
Ancient Iranian gods
Yazatas
Horses in mythology